

Men's events

Women's events

Team events

References

External links
 

European Games, Small States
2003 Games of the Small States of Europe
2003
Judo competitions in Malta